Montreal Academy of Music was a theatre/concert hall in Montreal, Quebec, Canada that dated from the late 19th century to the early 20th century. The hall was situated on the east side of Victoria Street just north of Saint Catherine Street. It was inaugurated in 1875 and demolished by 1910 so that the Goodwin's store could be enlarged. This building was known for its theatrical presentation.

History of Montreal